Ramy Akiki (born 24 December 1982) is a Lebanese basketball player with Champville SC  of the Lebanese Basketball League. He played year 2002–03 with American college team Cypress JC for a one-year before moving to Lebanese division 2 side Blue Stars in the 2003–04 season. In the 2004–05 season Ramy had been promoted to the Lebanese Basketball League as a result of his performance with Blue Stars and was additionally signed by Lebanese powerhouse Sporting Al Riyadi Beirut for one season. he was then waved the next year in order to join Tripoli Al Mouttahed Tripoli from 2004–2007 on a three-year contract. By then he was promoted back to the division level playing with Jounieh side Chahab from 2008 to 2011..

References

 

1982 births
Living people
Lebanese men's basketball players
Point guards
Al Riyadi Club Beirut basketball players